The Martin Dunsbach House is a historic house located in Colonie, Albany County, New York.

Description and history 
Built in about 1840, it is a two-story brick farmhouse constructed in the Greek Revival style. A -story ell features eyebrow windows. It has an unusual two-bay carriage shed incorporated into the ell.

It was listed on the National Register of Historic Places on October 3, 1985.

References

Houses on the National Register of Historic Places in New York (state)
Houses completed in 1840
Houses in Albany County, New York
National Register of Historic Places in Albany County, New York
Greek Revival houses in New York (state)